Björn Markus Seeliger (born 11 January 2000) is a Swedish swimmer. He was a junior champion in 50 m freestyle at the 2018 European Junior Swimming Championships and holds the Swedish record for 50 m backstroke. He was part of the Swedish team that won 4 × 100 m mixed relays at the 2019 FINA Swimming World Cup meet held in Berlin. He competed in the men's 100 metre freestyle event at the 2020 European Aquatics Championships, in Budapest, Hungary.

References

External links
 

2000 births
Living people
Swedish male backstroke swimmers
Swedish male freestyle swimmers
Swimmers at the 2018 Summer Youth Olympics
Swimmers at the 2020 Summer Olympics
Olympic swimmers of Sweden
California Golden Bears men's swimmers
European Aquatics Championships medalists in swimming
21st-century Swedish people